Holiday Flyer was an American Indie pop band formed in June 1993 by siblings John and Katie Conley. The band released their debut album in 1995. The band grew by one member for each of their next three records. Verna Brock (an alumna of Rocketship, Beanpole, and later the California Oranges) joined the group for 1997's The Rainbow Confection; Michael Yoas for 2000's You Make Us Go; and Jim Rivas (also of Rocketship) on, I Hope. Holiday Flyer disbanded in October 2002, with leaders John Conley and Katie Conley devoting more time to other projects, The California Oranges and The Sinking Ships.

Discography
Albums
 Try Not to Worry, 1995 (Silver Girl, SG-021)
 The Rainbow Confection, 1997 (Silver Girl, SG-030)
 You Make Us Go, 2000 (Darla, DRL 088)
 I Hope, 2001 (Darla, DRL 119)

EPs and Singles
 Snowballing, 1994 (Fingerpaint)
 Sweet and Sour, 1996 (Darla, DRL 017)
 Blue Harvest, 1998 (Darla, DRL 058)

Compilations
 Pop American Style, 1996 (March, MAR 024)
 The Verna Brock EP, 1998 (Papercut, PCT 005)

More information
 Holiday Flyer on TweeNet 
 Holiday Flyer on Allmusic []

Indie pop groups from California
Indie rock musical groups from California
People from Roseville, California
Darla Records artists